The 1978 Louisiana Tech Bulldogs football team was an American football team that represented Louisiana Tech University as a member of the Southland Conference during the 1978 NCAA Division I-A football season. In their twelfth year under head coach Maxie Lambright, the team compiled a 6–5 record and as Southland Conference co-champion.

Schedule

References

Louisiana Tech
Southland Conference football champion seasons
Louisiana Tech Bulldogs football seasons
Louisiana Tech Bulldogs football